Skidoo is an album by Harry Nilsson.  It is the original soundtrack recording for the 1968 Otto Preminger film Skidoo,  arranged and conducted by George Tipton and released by RCA Records.

Track 1, "The Cast and Crew", was used at the close of the film, and consists of Nilsson putting the entire end credits (key grip, Paramount logo, and copyright notice and all) to music and singing them.

Preminger gave Nilsson a cameo role in the film as a prison guard. The album's liner notes are by  radio disc jockey and voice artist Gary Owens.

Track listing
All music and lyrics by Harry Nilsson.

"The Cast and Crew" (vocals: Harry Nilsson) – 3:55
"I Will Take You There" (vocals: Harry Nilsson) – 2:30
"SKIDOO"/"Commercials" – 1:23
"Goodnight Mr. Banks"/"Let's Get the Hardware"/"Murder in the Car Wash" – 2:45
"Angie's Suite" – 4:20
"The Tree" – 2:49
"Garbage Can Ballet" (vocals: Harry Nilsson) – 2:00
"Tony's Trip" – 4:19
"Escape:Impossible"/"Green Bay Packers March" – 3:38
"Man Wasn't Meant to Fly" – 2:12
"Escape:Possible" – 2:15
"SKIDOO" (vocals: Carol Channing)/"Goodnight Mr. Banks" – 4:08

Harry Nilsson albums
1968 soundtrack albums
RCA Victor soundtracks
Albums produced by Rick Jarrard
Albums arranged by George Tipton
Comedy film soundtracks